Bettisia Gozzadini (1209 – 2 November 1261) was a jurist who lectured at the University of Bologna from about 1239. She is thought to be the first woman to have taught at a university.

Life 

Gozzadini was born in the commune of Bologna, in northern Italy, in 1209; her parents, Amadore Gozzadini and Adelasia de' Pegolotti, were of the nobility. Gozzadini studied philosophy, and then studied law under Giacomo Baldavino and Tancred of Bologna at the Studium of Bologna, where she also received encouragement from Odofredo. As a young woman she dressed as a man; it is not known whether this was because of social pressures, or was from personal choice.

She graduated from the university in 1237, and for two years taught law at her home. She was offered chair at the Studium, which at first she declined, but later accepted. According to legend, she had to wear a veil when teaching, to avoid distraction to her students; however, the same legend is also attached to Novella d'Andrea, and it is not known which – if either – it belongs to. Gozzadini was a noted orator, and on 31 May 1242 she gave the oration at the funeral of the Bishop of Bologna, Enrico della Fratta.

There was general mourning in the city, and the schools were closed. Her funeral was held at the church of the Padri Serviti.

Reception 

Gozzadini is thought to be the first woman to have taught at a university. A terracotta bust of her, one of a series of twelve representations of notable Bolognese women by the un-named "Scultore di Casa Fibbia", dates from the late seventeenth century. It was originally in the Salone d'Onore of Palazzo Fibbia Fabbri – now Palazzo Masetti Calzolari – and is now in the Museo della Storia di Bologna in Palazzo Pepoli. Gozzadini is the earliest of the twelve women depicted.

Her writings, on the Digest and on the lex omnes populi, are believed lost.

References

1209 births
1261 deaths
13th-century Italian women
13th-century Italian jurists
Italian women lawyers
Italian women academics
Academic staff of the University of Bologna
Women legal scholars